Luxembourg participated at the inaugural edition of the European Games in 2015. However, Luxembourg was one of the eight nations that failed to win a medal at the inaugural European Games.

Medal Tables

Medals by Games

Medals by sport

List of medallists

See also
 Luxembourg at the Olympics

References